Another Me is the first EP by Hong Kong pop singer Charlene Choi, who is also a member of duo Twins. The EP was released on October 15, 2009 under EEG, after her successfully album Lonely Me. EP contains three singles: Survivor, Put Too Low and Happiness Air.

Track listing
"Survivor"
"Put Too Low"
"Embrace Such"
"Happiness Air"
"Classmate"

Bonus DVD
"Survivor"
"Put Too Low"
"Happiness Air"

References

External links
 http://www.yesasia.com/us/another-me-ep-dvd/1021416764-0-0-0-en/info.html
 https://itunes.apple.com/us/album/another-me-ep/id543168676
 https://web.archive.org/web/20140329002832/http://grooveshark.com/#!/album/Another+Me+EP/5406885#!/album/Another+Me+EP/5406885
 http://starsbuz.blogspot.com/2009/10/charlene-choi-ep-another-me-album.html

2009 EPs
Pop music EPs
EPs by Hong Kong artists
Charlene Choi albums